Simonas Kymantas (born June 10, 1993) is a professional Lithuanian basketball player. He plays the center position.

International career 
Kymantas won silver medal while representing the Lithuanian U-16 National Team during the 2009 FIBA Europe Under-16 Championship.

References 

1993 births
Living people
Centers (basketball)
Lithuanian men's basketball players
Basketball players from Kaunas